Dutch Council may refer to:

 Council of State (Netherlands), a constitutionally established advisory body to the government
 Dutch Jewish council, a council that was active during the German occupation of the Netherlands in World War II